Senator Kyle may refer to:

James H. Kyle (1854–1901), U.S. Senator from South Dakota
Jim Kyle (born 1950), Tennessee State Senate
John C. Kyle (1851–1913), Mississippi State Senate
John W. Kyle (1891–1965), Mississippi State Senate
Sara Kyle (born 1952), Tennessee State Senate

See also
Jon Kyl (born 1942),  U.S. Senator from Arizona
Vernon Kyhl (1908–1973), Iowa State Senate